St. Sargis Church was an Armenian church located in Çənnəb village (Ordubad district) of the Nakhchivan Autonomous Republic of Azerbaijan. It was located in the southeastern part of the village, near Karmunji Hraparak (Bridge Square).

History 
The church was founded in 13–14th centuries, it was renovated in the 17th century and was repaired by S. Saghatelian in 1890.

Architectural characteristics 
The church was a single-nave structure with a semicircular apse and entrances in the north and west. The church had Armenian inscriptions inside, on the northern, southern, and western walls.

Destruction 
The church was still standing and intact as of February 3, 2000 and was destroyed between February 2000 and August 13, 2009, as documented by the investigation of the Caucasus Heritage Watch.

See also 
St. Astvatsatsin Monastery (Channab)
St. Stepanos Monastery (Channab)

References 

Ruins in Azerbaijan
Armenian churches in Azerbaijan